Kim Jong-Soo (born November 30, 1964) is a South Korean actor. He is best known for his supporting role in Kingdom, The Emperor: Owner of the Mask and Snowdrop.

Career 
In 1984, Kim joined the Whales Theatre and began his career in 1985 directing plays such as Beautiful Autograph, Tropical Thief Story, and My Lime Orange Tree. He debuted in the 2007 South Korean drama film Secret Sunshine as the new president and starred in the film Poongsan (2011) as the North Korean defector.

Most recently, he has been featured in the films: The Map Against the World (2016), Asura: The City Of Madness (2016), Our Love Story (2016), Tunnel (2017), Drug King (2018) and Money (2019). According to Artist Company, he is known as "a veteran actor who has a track record of over 70 theatre productions".

Filmography

Film

Television series

Web series

References

External links 

 Kim Jong-soo at HanCinema

Living people
1964 births
20th-century South Korean male actors
21st-century South Korean male actors
Male actors from Busan
South Korean male film actors
South Korean male television actors